Hapoel Morasha Ramat HaSharon was an Israeli football club based in the Morasha neighbourhood of Ramat HaSharon. They are currently in Liga Alef South division, and play home matches at the Grundman Stadium.

History
The club was founded in 2011. in their first season of existence, they won Liga Gimel Sharon division, and promoted to Liga Bet, after being undefeated, with 27 wins and 3 draws, scoring 155 goals and conceding 27. in their first season in Liga Bet, the club finished in the 7th place, and in the following season, the club made history by winning Liga Bet South A division, and were promoted to Liga Alef.

Honours

League

Cups

Notable former players
Felix Halfon
Tomer Shem-Tov

External links
Hapoel Morasha Ramat HaSharon  Israel Football Association

References

Morasha Ramat HaSharon
Morasha Ramat HaSharon
2011 establishments in Israel
2016 disestablishments in Israel
Association football clubs established in 2011
Association football clubs disestablished in 2016